The Wyandotte Nation is a federally recognized Native American tribe in northeastern Oklahoma. They are descendants of the Wendat Confederacy and Native Americans with territory near Georgian Bay and Lake Huron. Under pressure from Haudenosaunee and other tribes, then from European settlers and the United States government, the tribe gradually moved south and west to Michigan, Ohio, Kansas, and finally Oklahoma in the United States.

The Huron-Wendat Nation has a reserve at Wendake, Quebec, Canada.

Government
The headquarters of the federally recognized Wyandotte Nation is in Wyandotte, Oklahoma, and their tribal jurisdictional area is in Ottawa County, Oklahoma.

Billy Friend is the elected Chief, currently serving a four-year term. The Wyandotte Nation issues its own tribal vehicle tags and operates its own housing authority. It has a ten-man police department providing 24-hour law enforcement response to the Nation and surrounding area.

In 2022, 6,883 people are enrolled members of the nation. Only about 25 percent of the tribe lives within the state of Oklahoma. In 2011, that was 1,218 of 4,957 members. Enrollment is based in lineal descent; that is, the tribe has no minimum blood quantum requirement.

Economic development

The tribe operates the Bearskin Fitness Center, the Wyandotte Nation Environmental Department, and the Bearskin Health and Wellness Center. The Turtle Speaks is the tribal newspaper.

The tribe owns the Wyandotte Nation Casino in Wyandotte, Oklahoma. It owns a truck stop, a fuel station, and a smoke shop. They issue their own tribal vehicle tags.

It owns the 7th Street Casino in the former Scottish Rite Masonic Temple in Kansas City, Kansas. It has legal control of the nearby Wyandot National Burying Ground.
In 2010, the Wyandotte Nation acquired land in Park City, Kansas, with the stated intention of building a gaming casino and hotel.

Events
The tribe's annual powwow is held in Oklahoma during the first weekend of September and features contest dancing, gourd dancing, and a social stomp dance.

History
In its own language, the tribe is called Wendat, renamed Wyandotte after merging with other related groups. It consists of Iroquoian-speaking Indians from the eastern woodlands. The name is thought to mean "dwellers on a peninsula" or "islanders".

The first Wendat Confederacy was created around 1400 CE, when the Attignawantan (Bear Nation) and Attigingueenongnahac (Cord People) combined forces. They, in turn, were joined by the Arendaronon (People of the Rocks), Ataronchronon (People of One Lodge), and the Tahontaenrat (Deer Nation). Scholars once believed these peoples to be remnant bands of the St. Lawrence Iroquoians, who established villages located near present-day Montreal visited by early French explorers. Archaeologists have excavated large, 16th-century settlement sites north of Lake Ontario, suggesting that this may have been a site of the coalescence of the Wendat people. They later migrated to the area near Georgian Bay, where they were encountered by French explorers in the early 17th century.

French explorers encountered the Wyandotte around 1536 and dubbed them the Huron. They were fierce enemies of the nations of the Iroquois Confederacy, then based in present-day New York. Obliterated by smallpox epidemics, the Wendat Confederacy became seriously weakened during the early decades of the early seventeenth century. In 1649, it was defeated by the Iroquois and most members migrated southwest for safety, where they settled with Odawa and Illinois tribes. Others moved east into Quebec.

Remnants of the associated Wendat and Petun peoples came together as a new group, which became known as the Wyandot or Wyandotte. By the beginning of the 18th century, the Wyandotte people had moved into the Ohio River Valley, extending into areas of what would become West Virginia, Indiana, and Michigan. Around 1745, large groups settled near Sandusky, Ohio. After the American Revolution, a treaty signed with the United States in 1785 confirmed their landholdings. However, the 1795 Treaty of Greenville greatly reduced its size.

The 1817 Treaty of Fort Meigs reduced the Wyandotte lands drastically, leaving the people only small parcels in Ohio. In 1842, the Wyandotte nation all of its land east of the Mississippi River, under pressure of the United States government policy to remove the Native Americans to the West. It made a treaty with the U.S. government by which it was to be compensated for its lands.

The tribe was removed to the Delaware Reservation in present-day Kansas, then considered Indian Territory. During this migration and the early months, it suffered much illness. In 1843, survivors buried their dead on a high ridge overlooking the Missouri River in what became the Huron Cemetery in present-day Kansas City, Kansas. In 1971 it was listed on the National Register of Historic Places. It was renamed Wyandot National Burying Ground.

After the American Civil War, Wyandotte people who had not become citizens of the United States in 1855 in Kansas, were removed a final time in 1867 to present-day Oklahoma. The Seneca, Shawnee, and Wyandotte Industrial Boarding School, also called the Wyandotte Mission, opened for classes in Wyandotte, Oklahoma in 1872.

In 1893, the Dawes Act required that the tribal communal holdings in the Indian Territory be divided into individual allotments. The land was divided among the 241 tribal members listed on the Dawes Rolls. The Wyandotte members in Oklahoma retained some tribal structure, and still had control of the communal property of the Huron Cemetery, by then annexed into Kansas City, Kansas.

Reorganization as a nation
In 1937, seizing the opportunity presented by the US Oklahoma Indian Welfare Act of 1934 to regain tribal structure and self-government, the Wyandotte members organized into the Wyandotte Nation of Oklahoma, later changing its name to simply Wyandotte Nation, and achieved federal recognition. The act enabled Native Americans to hold property in common again, and to develop self-government and sovereignty.

Termination efforts
On August 1, 1956 the US Congress passed Public Law ch. 843, 70 Stat. 893 to terminate the Wyandotte Tribe of Oklahoma as part of the federal Indian termination policy. Three years were allotted for completion of termination. One of the stipulations required that a parcel of land in Kansas City, Kansas, reserved as the Huron Cemetery, which had been awarded to the Wyandot by treaty on 31 January 1855, was to be sold by the United States. Litigation was filed by a group of Absentee Wyandot against the United States and Kansas City, prohibiting the federal government from fulfilling the terms of the termination statute and ultimately preventing termination of the Wyandotte Nation. The Bureau of Land Management records confirm that the Federal Register never published the termination of the Wyandotte lands and thus they were never officially terminated.

When Congress restored the other Oklahoma Tribes, it included the Wyandotte in the repeal. On May 15, 1978, in a single Act titled Public Law 95-281, the termination laws were repealed, and the three tribes were reinstated with all rights and privileges they had prior to termination.

Huron Cemetery
For decades, the Huron Cemetery was a source of controversy between the Wyandotte Nation of Oklahoma and Wyandot descendants in Kansas. The former wanted to sell the property for redevelopment. Kansas City was also eager for that development, as the city had annexed all of the property in the area. By 1907 it was a prime site, near a new Carnegie Library, the Grund Hotel, and the Masonic Temple under reconstruction after a fire.

In 1906, the Wyandotte Nation authorized the Secretary of Interior to sell the cemetery, with the bodies to be reinterred at nearby Quindaro Cemetery. This proposal was opposed by Lyda Conley and her two sisters in Kansas City, who launched what became a multi-year campaign to preserve the burying ground. They achieved much support. In 1916, Senator Charles Curtis of Kansas, who was of partially Native American descent, won passage of a bill protecting the cemetery as a national park and providing some funds for maintenance. Ironically, it was the dispute over this cemetery, that saved the tribe from termination during the 1950s.

Over the years, the Wyandotte Nation continued to explore ways to increase revenues for the tribe, including redevelopment of the Huron Cemetery. Descendants in Kansas vigorously resisted these efforts. In 1971, the cemetery was listed on the National Register of Historic Places. In 1998, the Wyandotte Nation of Oklahoma and the Wyandot Nation of Kansas reached agreement to preserve the Wyandot National Burying Ground for religious, cultural, and related uses appropriate to its sacred history and use.

Wendat Confederacy
In August 1999, the Wyandotte Nation joined the contemporary Wendat Confederacy, together with the Wyandot Nation of Kansas, Huron-Wendat Nation of Wendake (Quebec), and the Wyandot of Anderdon Nation in Michigan. The tribes pledged to provide mutual aid to each other in a spirit of peace, kinship, and unity.

This followed an important meeting of Huronia reconciliation in Midland, Ontario, Canada, attended by representatives of the Iroquois Confederacy, Wyandotte nations, British, French, Dutch, Anglican Church and Catholic Jesuit brothers. The weekend of events was organized by the Huronia Reconciliation Committee.

See also
Leaford Bearskin (1921–2012), Chief of the Wyandotte Nation (1983–2011)
Bertrand N. O. Walker (1870-1927), writer who published under his Wyandotte name, Hen-Toh
Wyandot for early tribal history in Ohio

References

External links

7th Street Casino, official website

Nation
Native American tribes in Oklahoma
Federally recognized tribes in the United States